Ghirmai Efrem (born 4 April 1996) is an Eritrean swimmer. He competed in the men's 50 metre freestyle at the 2020 Summer Olympics.

References

External links
 

1996 births
Living people
Eritrean male swimmers
Olympic swimmers of Eritrea
Swimmers at the 2020 Summer Olympics
Sportspeople from Helsingborg
Swedish people of Eritrean descent
Swedish sportspeople of African descent
African Games competitors for Eritrea
Swimmers at the 2019 African Games
21st-century Eritrean people
20th-century Eritrean people